Justice Evans may refer to:

A. A. Evans, associate justice of the Alabama Supreme Court
Beverly Daniel Evans Jr., associate justice of the Supreme Court of Georgia
David Evans (judge), associate justice of the Delaware Supreme Court
John Evans (judge), associate justice of the Supreme Court of Pennsylvania
Lemuel D. Evans, associate justice of the Supreme Court of Texas
Richard Evans (judge), associate justice of the New Hampshire Supreme Court
Robert E. Evans, associate justice of the Nebraska Supreme Court
William D. Evans, associate justice of the Iowa Supreme Court

See also
Judge Evans (disambiguation)